Bosjökloster is a castle located on the shore of Lake Ringsjön in Höör Municipality, Scania, Sweden.

History
It was originally a nunnery, founded in 1080 by the Benedictine Order. The oldest preserved document that mentions Bosjö Abbey was written by Pope Lucius III in 1181, when he confirmed its privileges.  The abbey was transformed into a castle in the 16th century, and only parts of the original building remains. During the Danish Reformation in the 16th century, the nunnery was closed down and the estate became Danish crown property. It was subsequently donated to  Torbern Bille,  the former archbishop of the Diocese of Lund under the condition that he took care of the remaining nuns. In 1560 King Frederick II of Denmark gave the estate as a barter to the widowed Scanian noble woman  Thale Ulfstand. Her initials and the year 1569 are carved into the large oak doors of the entrance and are still visible.

The castle passed to the Beck family through marriage in 1629, but when Jochum Beck (1602-1682) lost the family fortune, it was sold to Corfitz Ulfeldt  (1606–1664)  to repay his debts. Ulfeldt was a Danish aristocrat famous for having switched sides. When he showed up at the peace negotiations at the Treaty of Roskilde proceedings to negotiate on behalf of Sweden, he was convicted of treason by a Danish court. Soon thereafter, he was also convicted of treason by a Swedish court, and was forced into exile. His wife Leonora Christina (1621-1698), daughter of King Christian IV, was captured in his place by the Danish authorities and was imprisoned in the Blue Tower in Copenhagen for 22 years. 

Bosjökloster Castle was sequestered by the Swedish state and fell into disrepair. After a lawsuit in 1735, Bosjökloster was returned to the Beck family, who renovated the castle. They sold it in 1908 to Count Philip Bonde, whose family still owns Bosjökloster.
The composer Hilding Rosenberg  (1892–1985) was born in the gardener's residence just south of the church tower.

Gallery

See also
List of castles in Skåne

References

External links
Bosjökloster Slott Official site

Castles in Skåne County
Tourist attractions in Skåne County
Buildings and structures in Skåne County